John McRae Scott (3 November 1906 – 18 September 1981) was a Scottish professional footballer who played as a half-back or an inside forward in the Football League for Norwich City, Walsall, York City and Southport, in non-League football for Loughborough Corinthians and Workington, was on the books of Luton Town and Bristol Rovers without making a league appearance and in Scottish football for Euchan Thistle, Kello Rovers and Nithsdale Wanderers.

References

1906 births
People from Sanquhar
1981 deaths
Scottish footballers
Association football midfielders
Association football forwards
Kello Rovers F.C. players
Nithsdale Wanderers F.C. players
Luton Town F.C. players
Loughborough Corinthians F.C. players
Norwich City F.C. players
Bristol Rovers F.C. players
Walsall F.C. players
York City F.C. players
Southport F.C. players
Workington A.F.C. players
English Football League players